"Then Came You" is a 1974 song recorded by American soul singer Dionne Warwick and American R&B group The Spinners. It was credited to Dionne Warwicke and the Spinners (from 1971 to 1975, Warwick added a final 'e' to her last name).  The track was written by Sherman Marshall and Phillip T. Pugh, and produced by Thom Bell.

Released during a time that Warwick's chart fortunes were at an ebb after moving to Warner Bros. Records in 1972, the Philadelphia soul single was a rare mid-1970s success for the singer. Sung as a duet with Spinners main lead singer Bobby Smith and the Spinners, who were one of the most popular groups of the decade, the song became Warwick's first ever single to reach number one on the US Billboard Hot 100 and also became her highest-charting R&B record of the 1970s, reaching number two on that chart, behind Barry White's "Can't Get Enough of Your Love, Babe" (itself a Hot 100 number-one single). It was also the first number-one pop hit for the Spinners. It became an RIAA gold record, and was nominated for a Grammy.

Background
Spinners member Phillippe Wynne took over lead duties at the very end of the song, as he did on another one of the group's big hits, "Could It Be I'm Falling in Love".

While Warwick was signed to Warner Bros. at the time, this release actually came out on Atlantic Records, which was the Spinners' label, but also a sister label to Warner Bros.

Warwick eventually left Warner Bros. for Arista Records in 1978 where she regrouped and found consistent success again as an artist.

Chart performance

Weekly charts

Year-end charts

All-time charts

References

External links
 Lyrics of this song
 

1974 singles
Billboard Hot 100 number-one singles
Cashbox number-one singles
Dionne Warwick songs
The Spinners (American group) songs
1974 songs
Atlantic Records singles